Kásád is a village in Baranya County, Hungary. It contains the southernmost point in the country.

External links 
Local stats 

Populated places in Baranya County